David Quezada (born August 28, 1973 in Costa Rica) is a former United States international soccer player.

External links
 

1973 births
Living people
American soccer players
C.D. FAS footballers
American people of Costa Rican descent
United States men's international soccer players
Association football forwards